The Wowei River (also Wewe or Wawe) is a river in northern Southwest Papua, Indonesia. It flows in the Tambrauw Regency and discharges into the Pacific Ocean.

Geography
The river flows in the southern area of Southwest Papua with predominantly tropical rainforest climate (designated as Af in the Köppen-Geiger climate classification). The annual average temperature in the area is 22 °C. The warmest month is August, when the average temperature is around 24 °C, and the coldest is January, at 20 °C. The average annual rainfall is 3322 mm.. The wettest month is June, with an average of 381 mm rainfall, and the driest is October, with 153 mm rainfall.

See also
List of rivers of Indonesia
List of rivers of Western New Guinea

References

Rivers of Southwest Papua 
Rivers of Indonesia